Astralium lapillus is a species of sea snail, a marine gastropod mollusk in the family Turbinidae, the turban snails.

Description
The size of the shell varies between 14 mm and 25 mm. The imperforate shell has an obtusely turbinated shape. its color pattern is  fulvous, tinged with red at the base. Most of the specimens are strongly covered with incrustations, which render it impossible to count the whorls. The whorls convexly slope next the suture, then become tumidly rounded. They are longitudinally rudely ribbed with ribs irregularly wrinkled and tuberculated. The convex base of the shell is very closely irregularly scaled, with indistinct spiral lirae and fine radiating lamellae. The margin is more or less lobed. The aperture has rose-colored margins. The interior of the aperture is grooved at some distance from the margin; only the groove corresponding to the keel, reaches the outer margin. The operculum is externally very convex, with close-set granules, the margin is deep violet, especially the columellar one.

Distribution
This marine species occurs off the Philippines and Fiji.

References

External links
 To World Register of Marine Species

lapillus
Gastropods described in 1863